Rais Muhammad Iqbal (born 1954 in Allah Abad) is a lawyer and a member of the Provincial Assembly of the Punjab from Liaquat Pur.

External links
 Profile at Punjab Assembly

Living people
Punjab MPAs 2002–2007
Pakistan Muslim League (Q) politicians
People from Rahim Yar Khan District
1954 births